Die Stiere des Hidalgo is an East German film. It was released in 1959.

External links
 

1959 films
East German films
1950s German-language films
1950s German films